Mohammed Usman Arif (5 April 1923 – 22 August 1995) was a leader of Indian National Congress. Born on 5 April 1923 in Bikaner in the Indian state of Rajasthan, he did his graduation from Dungar College, Bikaner and then completed his master's degree and LLB from Aligarh Muslim University. Later on he joined the Indian National Congress and rose to become the President of Rajasthan state unit of the party in 1980. He was elected to Rajya Sabha and was a minister in the Government of India from 1980 to 1984. He was also associated with Rajasthan State Haj Committee and Rajasthan Board of Muslim Waqfs. He was governor of Uttar Pradesh state from  31 March 1985 to 11 February 1990.
He died in 1995.

Bibliography
 Aqeedat ke Phool- A tribute to Mrs. Indira Gandhi 
 Qalam ki Kaasht
 Nazr-e-Watan

References

20th-century Indian Muslims
Aligarh Muslim University alumni
Governors of Uttar Pradesh
1995 deaths
Rajya Sabha members from Rajasthan
People from Bikaner
1923 births
Faculty of Law, Aligarh Muslim University alumni
Indian National Congress politicians from Rajasthan